Atascosa verecundella is a species of snout moth in the genus Atascosa. It was described by George Hampson in 1901 and is known from Colombia, British Guiana and Panama.

References

Anerastiini
Moths described in 1901
Moths of Central America
Moths of South America